The 2008 Pro Bowl was the National Football League's all-star game for the 2007 season. It was played at Aloha Stadium in Honolulu, Hawaii on February 10, 2008. The game was televised in the United States by Fox and began shortly after 11:40am local time (4:40pm EST) following Pole Qualifying for 2008 Daytona 500. The NFC won, 42–30, despite a 17-point first half AFC lead. NFC running back Adrian Peterson rushed 16 times for 129 yards and was named the game's MVP, winning a Cadillac CTS in recognition of his efforts.

The starting rosters for the game were released on December 18, 2007, with New England Patriots quarterback Tom Brady starting for the AFC and the Green Bay Packers' Brett Favre for the NFC. However, Brett Favre withdrew due to an ankle injury. Notable Pro Bowl selections included the late Sean Taylor. The Dallas Cowboys had a record thirteen players named to the Pro Bowl roster, while five teams, including all four members of the NFC South, had no players initially named (Jeff Garcia of the Tampa Bay Buccaneers was later chosen as a replacement quarterback for Brett Favre.) This was the first occasion since their 1–15 1980 season that the New Orleans Saints had no player make the Pro Bowl. The AFC was coached by Norv Turner of the San Diego Chargers staff, while Mike McCarthy and the staff of the Green Bay Packers coached the NFC. Three Washington Redskins players (Chris Cooley, Chris Samuels and Ethan Albright) wore #21 in memory of Taylor, their deceased teammate. The game featured 41 players appearing in their first Pro Bowl (out of 86 total players), the most in eight years.  In addition, the NFC played their first defensive play with only ten players on the field, lacking a free safety, in Taylor's honor.

On February 4, 2008, Brady, Patriots receiver Randy Moss, Chargers tight end Antonio Gates, and Chargers defensive lineman Jamal Williams decided to pull out of the 2008 Pro Bowl. Brady was replaced by Cleveland Browns quarterback Derek Anderson, Moss was replaced by Cincinnati Bengals receiver Chad Johnson, Gates was replaced by Browns tight end Kellen Winslow, and Williams was replaced by Pittsburgh Steelers defensive lineman Casey Hampton.

The game was the most watched Pro Bowl since 2000, pulling in a Nielsen rating of 6.3 and a 12 share. It also marked the first ever Pro Bowl to be televised by Fox.  The 2008 Pro Bowl also marked the fewest players represented by a Super Bowl winning team, with Osi Umenyiora being the lone representative of the New York Giants, winners of Super Bowl XLII.

Scoring summary
1st Quarter
AFC – Lorenzo Neal 1-yard run (Rob Bironas kick), 10:59. AFC 7–0. Drive: 7 plays, 70 yards, 4:01.
NFC – Larry Fitzgerald 6-yard pass from Tony Romo (Nick Folk kick), 7:08. Tied 7–7. Drive: 9 plays, 54 yards, 3:51.
AFC – T.J. Houshmandzadeh 16-yard pass from Peyton Manning (Rob Bironas kick), 2:42. AFC 14–7. Drive: 9 plays, 58 yards, 4:26.
AFC – Rob Bironas 33-yard FG, 0:48. AFC 17–7. Drive: 5 plays, 14 yards, 1:41.

2nd Quarter
AFC – T.J. Houshmandzadeh 1-yard pass from Ben Roethlisberger (Rob Bironas kick), 12:08. AFC 24–7. Drive: 4 plays, 29 yards, 1:48.
NFC – Terrell Owens 6-yard pass from Tony Romo (Nick Folk kick), 7:58. AFC 24–14. Drive: 8 plays, 51 yards, 4:10.
AFC – Rob Bironas 48-yard FG, 3:30. AFC 27–14. Drive: 9 plays, 51 yards, 4:28.
NFC – Chris Cooley 17-yard pass from Matt Hasselbeck (Nick Folk kick), 0:28. AFC 27–21. Drive: 6 plays, 77 yards, 3:02.
3rd Quarter
NFC – Adrian Peterson 17-yard run (Nick Folk kick), 9:49. NFC 28–27. Drive: 9 plays, 67 yards, 5:11.
AFC – Rob Bironas 28-yard FG, 6:58. AFC 30–28. Drive: 6 plays, 56 yards, 2:51.
4th Quarter
NFC – Terrell Owens 6-yard pass from Jeff Garcia (Nick Folk kick), 12:29. NFC 35–30. Drive: 9 plays, 80 yards, 5:46.
NFC – Adrian Peterson 6-yard run (Nick Folk kick), 2:43. NFC 42–30. Drive: 9 plays, 73 yards, 5:21.

AFC roster

Offense

Defense

Special teams

NFC roster

Offense

Defense

Special teams

Notes:
Replacement selection due to injury or vacancy
Injured player; selected but did not play
Replacement starter; selected as reserve
"Need player"; named by coach
Posthumous selection
 Wore 21 in honor of Sean Taylor
Replacement for posthumous selection Sean Taylor

Number of selections per team

Halftime
The halftime show featured a performance by the band Lifehouse, who played their songs "Hanging by a Moment" and "First Time".

Foreign transmissions
Denmark – TV3+
Norway – SportN
United Kingdom – Sky Sports
Middle East – Showsports 4

References

External links

Official Pro Bowl website at NFL.com
Article examining the 2008 Pro Bowl's effect on Hawaii's tourism

2008
2007 National Football League season
2008 in American football
2008 in sports in Hawaii
2008 in Oceanian sport
American football competitions in Honolulu
February 2008 sports events in the United States